The 2019–20 South Florida Bulls women's basketball team represented the University of South Florida in the 2019–20 NCAA Division I women's basketball season. The Bulls were coached by Jose Fernandez in his twentieth season and played their home games at Yuengling Center in Tampa, Florida. This was USF's seventh season as a member of the American Athletic Conference, known as The American or AAC. They finished the season 18–12, 10–6 in AAC play to finish in fourth place. They advanced to the semifinals of the American Athletic Conference women's tournament, where they lost to Connecticut.

Media
All Bulls games will air on Bullscast Radio or CBS 1010 AM. Conference home games will rotate between ESPN3, AAC Digital, and Bullscast. Road games will typically be streamed on the opponents website, though conference road games could also appear on ESPN3 or AAC Digital.

Roster

Schedule

|-
!colspan=9 style=| Non-conference regular season

|-
!colspan=9 style=| AAC regular season

|-
!colspan=12 style="background:#006747;"|AAC Women's Tournament

Rankings

^Coaches did not release a Week 2 poll.

See also
2019–20 South Florida Bulls men's basketball team

References

South Florida Bulls women's basketball seasons
South Florida